Chaim Yehuda Leib Auerbach (1883 – 26 September 1954) was a haredi rabbi and rosh yeshiva (dean) of Shaar Hashamayim Yeshiva in Jerusalem, which he helped found in 1906. He was the father of the posek (decider of Jewish legal issues) Shlomo Zalman Auerbach.

Family
His father was Avraham Dov Auerbach, the rebbe of Chernowitz in Poland.

Auerbach married Tzivya, the daughter of Shlomo Zalman Porush, a rabbi who founded the Jerusalem neighborhood of Sha'arei Hesed. Their first son, the authority on Jewish law Shlomo Zalman Auerbach, was the first child born in Sha'arei Hesed. The family lived in poverty. 

He wrote a Torah commentary called Chacham Lev.

He died on 26 September 1954 (28 Elul 5714), a month after having a heart attack.

Shaar Hashamayim Yeshiva 

Auerbach and his friend Shimon Tzvi Horowitz opened a yeshiva for the study of the kabbalah as interpreted by the 16th century rabbi Isaac Luria in the Old City of Jerusalem, with a Talmud Torah, a yeshiva ketana, a yeshiva gedola, and a kollel for married students.

Auerbach was rosh yeshiva of Shaar Hashamayim Yeshiva from 1906 until his death in 1954 and was succeeded in the post by two of his sons, first Eliezer Auerbach was rosh yeshiva and then Refoel Dovid Auerbach. His eldest son, Shlomo Zalman Auerbach, served as president of the yeshiva; after his death, his son, Shmuel Auerbach, succeeded him.

References

Sources

Further reading
Meir, Jonatan. "The Imagined Decline of Kabbalah: The Kabbalistic Yeshiva Sha'ar ha-Shamayim and Kabbalah in Jerusalem in the Beginning of the Twentieth Century" in Kabbalah and Modernity. Boaz Huss, Marco Pasi, and Kocku von Stuckrad, eds. Brill: Leiden & Boston, 2010, pp. 197–220.

Israeli Rosh yeshivas
20th-century rabbis in Jerusalem
Haredi rabbis in Israel
Ashkenazi rabbis in Ottoman Palestine
Haredi rabbis in Mandatory Palestine
Burials at Har HaMenuchot
1883 births
1954 deaths